The 2013 Waterford Crystal Cup will be the eighth staging of the Waterford Crystal Cup since its establishment in 2006. The draw for the 2013 fixtures took place on 8 November 2012. The competition will begin on 20 January 2013 and is scheduled to end on 10 February 2013.

Tipperary were the defending champions. The final was contested by Clare and Tipp under lights in Thurles on 9 February 2013, with Clare winning by 1-21 to 1-13.

Teams

A total of twelve teams will contest the Waterford Crystal Cup, including a return for all of the teams from the 2012 Waterford Crystal Cup.

Mary Immaculate College will make their debut in the competition while Cork Institute of Technology, who last took part in the competition in 2011, will not field a team once again.

Fixtures

Preliminary round

Quarter-finals

Semi-finals

Final

Top scorers

Single game

References

Waterford
Waterford Crystal Cup